The 2019–20 EHF Challenge Cup was the 23rd edition of the European Handball Federation's third-tier competition for men's handball clubs, running from 5 October 2019 to 24 May 2020.
On 24 April 2020 EHF announced that the competition would be cancelled due to COVID-19 pandemic.

Overview

Team allocation

Round and draw dates 
All draws will be held at the European Handball Federation headquarters in Vienna, Austria.
On 25 March, the EHF announced that no matches will be played before June due to the coronavirus pandemic.

Round 2 
Teams listed first played the first leg at home.
The first legs were played on 5–6 October and the second legs were played on 12–13 October 2019. Some teams agreed to play both matches in the same venue.

|}
Notes

1 Both legs were hosted by HC Dukla Prague.
2 Both legs were hosted by TJ Sokol Nové Veselí.
3 Both legs were hosted by Drammen HK.
4 Both legs were hosted by HC Tallinn.
5 Both legs were hosted by Odessa HC.
6 Both legs were hosted by H71.
7 Both legs were hosted by Livingston HC.
8 Both legs were hosted by Granitas-Karys.
9 Both legs were hosted by HCB Karviná.
10 Both legs were hosted by HC Victor.

Round 3 
A total of 32 teams entered the draw for the third qualification round, which was held on Tuesday, 15 October 2019. The draw seeding pots were composed as follows:

Teams listed first played the first leg at home. The first legs were played on 16–17 November and the second legs were played on 23–24 November 2019.

|}
Notes

1 Both legs were hosted by Masheka Mogilev.
2 Both legs were hosted by Halden Topphåndball.
3 Both legs were hosted by Madeira Andebol SAD.
4 Both legs were hosted by BSV Bern.
5 Both legs were hosted by Beykoz BLD SK.
6 Both legs were hosted by SGS Ramhat Hashron HC.
7 Both legs were hosted by Bregenz Handball.
8 Both legs were hosted by A.E.K. Athens H.C.

Last 16 
The draw seeding pots for the Last 16 Knockout round were composed as follows: The draw for the last 16 round was held on 26 November 2019.

The first leg was scheduled for 8–9 February, while the second leg followed on 15–16 February 2020.

|}

Notes

1 Both legs were hosted by Beykoz BLD SK.

Matches

A.E.K. Athens H.C. won 60–58 on aggregate.

HC Viktor won 73–68 on aggregate.

Valur won 57–55 on aggregate.

Halden Topphåndball won 46–45 on aggregate.

HCB Karviná won 60–57 on aggregate.

HC Dukla Prague won 66–56 on aggregate.

AHC Potaissa Turda won 69–68 on aggregate.

CSM București won 53–52 on aggregate.

Quarterfinals 

The draw event was held at the EHF Office in Vienna on Tuesday 18 February 2020. The draw will determine the quarter-final and also the semi-final pairings. Teams listed first will play the first leg at home. For the quarter-finals, there is no seeding as all eight teams will be drawn from the same pot one after another. There will be also no country protection applied in the draw. The semi-final draw will follow using the quarter-final pairings. 

The first quarter-final leg is scheduled for 21–22 March, while the second leg will follow on 28–29 March 2020.

The European Handball Federation announced on 13 March 2020, that the Quarter-final matches will not be held as scheduled due to the ongoing developments in the spread of COVID-19 across Europe. On 24 April 2020 the matches were cancelled.

|}

Matches

Final four

The first semi-final legs was scheduled for 25–26 April 2020, while the second legs was supposed to follow on 2–3 May 2020, but it will be rescheduled and is foreseen to be played in an EHF FINAL4 format in one venue over two playing days. ON 24 April 2020 the matches were cancelled.

Bracket

Semifinals

Third place game

Final

Top goalscorers

See also 
 2019–20 EHF Champions League
 2019–20 EHF Cup

References

External links 
 EHF Challenge Cup (official website)

Challenge Cup
Challenge Cup
EHF Challenge Cup
EHF Challenge Cup